"Roll in Peace" is a song by American rapper Kodak Black, featuring American rapper XXXTentacion. It was the lead single from his fifth mixtape Project Baby 2 (2017).  It was sent to rhythmic radio as the second single from the mixtape on August 18, 2017, by Dollaz N Dealz Entertainment, Sniper Gang, and Atlantic Records. The track was written by the artists themselves alongside its producers London on da Track  & Cubeatz.

Music video
The song's accompanying music video premiered on January 15, 2018, on Kodak Black's YouTube account. The video, created with help from AWGE, opens with a mannequin dressed like a police officer at a court hearing, progressing to Kodak rapping in the courtroom and later a church dressed in an orange prison jumpsuit. XXXTentacion did not appear in the video, instead providing a voiceover before his verse asking his fans to come and support him during his then upcoming court hearing.

Commercial performance
"Roll in Peace" debuted at number 53 on US Billboard Hot 100 for the chart dated September 9, 2017. The song then later peaked at number 31 on the US Billboard Hot 100 for the chart dated February 3, 2018. It spent 26 weeks on the chart before falling out on the chart dated March 3, 2018.  The song is Kodak Black's third top 40 single and his fourth highest-charting single. In February 2018, the song was certified Platinum by the Recording Industry Association of America (RIAA) for earning 1,000,000 equivalent units in the United States.

Remixes
Several remixes of the song have been released by artists such as Migos, Gucci Mane, Travis Scott, Lil Wayne, Nasty C, Remy Ma and T-Pain. An "Aussie Mix" version was also created by Australian rappers ChillinIt and Wombat.

Charts

Weekly charts

Year-end charts

Certifications

References

2017 songs
2017 singles
Kodak Black songs
XXXTentacion songs
Songs written by Tim Gomringer
Songs written by Kevin Gomringer
Songs written by Kodak Black
Song recordings produced by Cubeatz
Songs written by London on da Track
Song recordings produced by London on da Track